Keijiro Ogawa (小川 慶治朗, born 14 July 1992) is a Japanese football player for Yokohama FC.

Club career
On 13 July 2022, he signed with FC Seoul, on loan from Yokohama FC. He left the club at the end of the season.

International career
In October 2009, Ogawa was elected Japan U-17 national team for 2009 U-17 World Cup. He played 2 matches as substitutes.

Career statistics

Club 
Updated to 19 February 2019.

1Includes Emperor's Cup.
2Includes J. League Cup.

Honours
Vissel Kobe
Emperor's Cup: 2019
Japanese Super Cup: 2020

References

External links
Profile at Vissel Kobe
j-league

1992 births
Living people
Association football people from Hyōgo Prefecture
Japanese footballers
Japan youth international footballers
J1 League players
J2 League players
K League 1 players
A-League Men players
Vissel Kobe players
Shonan Bellmare players
Western Sydney Wanderers FC players
FC Seoul players
Association football forwards
Japanese expatriate sportspeople in Australia
Expatriate footballers in South Korea
Japanese expatriate sportspeople in South Korea